Aberford is a village and civil parish on the eastern outskirts of the City of Leeds metropolitan borough in Yorkshire, United Kingdom. It had a population of 1,059 at the 2001 census, increasing to 1,180 at the 2011 Census.

Etymology
The name 'Aberford' comes from the Old English woman's name Ēadburg and ford, which, then as now, meant 'ford'. The name meant 'Eadburg's ford'. This suggests the settlement's once-strategic importance. The name was recorded as Ædburford in 1176 and Ædburgford in 1177, Ebberford in the 13th century and Aberford from 1208.

History
Aberford was where the ancient Great North Road crossed over the Cock River (now reduced in volume as the Cock Beck). Aberford was the midway point between London and Edinburgh, being around  distant from each city until the construction of the A1(M) motorway bypass starting at Hook Moor.  On the north side of the river the Aberford Dykes earthworks were constructed to defend the crossing.  The buried remains of a Roman fort have been found beneath Aberford House. The current bridge dates from the 18th century.

Aberford was in the ancient Kingdom of Elmet, the name given to the local parliamentary constituency. An Anglo-Saxon gold ring, inscribed with the name of King Alfred the Great's sister Æthelswith, was found in a ploughed field near the village in 1870. It was bequeathed by A.W. Franks to the British Museum in 1897. In the 17th century the village was a major place for the manufacture of pins.

Aberford's growth has historically been along the road and the village has developed a linear rather than nucleated profile. Since the early 1990s much new housing has been constructed, as increasing affluence allows people to move away from city centres to rural and suburban areas.

Geology
Geologically, Aberford lies slightly east of the narrow basal sandstone boundary between the central Leeds' Coal Measures and much harder magnesian limestone deposits, and sits in an area shaped heavily by subsidence of the underlying Coal Measures.

Buildings
Aberford is considered "a place of special architectural and historic interest". Some notable buildings are:

 St Ricarius Church. The parish church is an 1861 rebuilding of a 12th-century one.
 The Gascoigne Almshouses designed by George Fowler Jones was built by sisters Mary Isabella and Elizabeth Gascoigne in 1844 to commemorate their father, Richard Oliver Gascoigne and two brothers who died in quick succession.  They are grade II* listed buildings.
 Aberford House is a classical 18th century mansion on Main Street.
 The Swan Hotel, previously a staging post used by those travelling the Great North Road.
 The Arabian Horse Inn is one of a very few public houses in the UK with this name, and a landmark with the conservation area.

Aberford Church of England primary School is affiliated with the parish church adjacent to it. The school was originally a tithe barn and is owned by the Archdeacon of York following  its transfer from the Vicar of Aberford. Previously, it and much of the village was owned by Oriel College, Oxford, which also received tithes from Aberford. At the northern boundary is the A64 road from Leeds to York and Scarborough. At the south end of Aberford is what used to be Hicklam Mill Farm now a small certified caravan and camping site.

Parlington Estate

The Parlington Estate holds a monument to the independence of the United States, built by Sir Thomas Gascoigne, last of the Gascoigne family  blood line. It is inscribed on both elevations with the phrase "Liberty in N.America Triumphant MDCCLXXXIII". The 'Dark Arch', a short curved tunnel along Parlington Lane is reputed to be haunted. It was built  to shield the residents of Parlington Hall from traffic passing along Parlington Lane, mostly horse drawn coal traffic on its way to the village distribution point for onward travel into the local market.

The lane was later developed for the private Aberford Railway commonly called the "Fly Line" to transport the coal from the Gascoigne's pits to Garforth. The railway closed in 1924. Parlington Hall was left to run to ruins after the death of Col F. C. T. Gascoigne in 1905, the hall was largely demolished in the 1950s and 1960s, though the west wing is still intact. The estate was used by the army during the First and Second World Wars. The structures, built during the Second World War and still in existence (2009), were constructed by the soldiers of No.3 Vehicle Repair Depot, part of Royal Army Ordnance Corps.

Nellie's Tree is a local landmark that was voted English and British Tree of the Year for 2018.

Gallery

Location grid

See also
Listed buildings in Aberford

References

Sources

External links

 Aberford community website with local news and parish council information
A comprehensive History of Parlington Hall, and features associated with the hall like the Ice House, the Dark Arch and the Triumphal Arch.'
Leeds's geology
Aberford C of E School
Roman Roads in Britain (large map, recommended that this is opened in a separate window)
Details on the Great North Road
The Aberford Railway (Fly Line), at the LNER Encyclopedia
Photos of Aberford and surrounding area on geograph
Leodis View photographs of Aberford on the Leeds photographic archive.

 
Villages in West Yorkshire
Places in Leeds
Civil parishes in West Yorkshire